Chlorination may refer to:

 Chlorination reaction, a halogenation reaction using chlorine
 Water chlorination, a method of water treatment